Midmar Dam is a combined gravity & earth-fill type dam and recreation area located near Howick and Pietermaritzburg, South Africa. Boating, swimming, waterskiing, picnicking, and fishing are popular pastimes at Midmar Dam. Each year, the Midmar Mile swimming race is held there, which organizers call "the world's largest open water swimming event". Over 20,000 entries were received for the 2009 event. Midmar Dam is located in the Midlands of KwaZulu-Natal. The dam's primary purpose is to serve for municipal and industrial use and its hazard potential has been ranked high (3).

Morgenzon has camping and caravanning sites, both powered and non-powered. The dam also hosts a yacht club, and lock up storage facilities for boats.

Midmar Dam is easily accessible from the N3 motorway.

See also 
 List of reservoirs and dams in South Africa
 List of rivers of South Africa
 Umgeni River
 Midmar Mile

References 

Buildings and structures in KwaZulu-Natal
Dams in South Africa
Tourist attractions in KwaZulu-Natal
Dams completed in 1965